The  is an electric multiple unit (EMU) train type operated by the Tokyo subway operator Tokyo Metropolitan Bureau of Transportation (Toei) on the Toei Oedo Line in Tokyo, Japan. The first 12-600 series first entered service in 2012. A total of 22 eight-car sets were built from 2011 by Kawasaki and Nippon Sharyo.

Overview
The 12-600 series sets were delivered from fiscal 2011. Broadly based on the earlier 12-000 series design (sets 16 to 53), these sets included a number of design improvements. The latest batch of sets entered service on 15 February 2019 and use a different headlamp setup, with a dual headlamp-taillamp fixture; as opposed to shield-beam headlamps as used on the first eight sets, these use LED fixtures.

As of 2018, ten sets are in service and are all based at Kiba Depot.

Formation
The 12-600 sets are formed as shown below, with all cars motored.

 Each M1 car is fitted with a single-arm pantograph.
 Car 5 is designated as a mildly-air-conditioned car.

Interior

Build history
The 12-600 series fleet details are as shown below.

History
The first 12-600 series set (cars 12-611 to 12-618) was delivered from the Kawasaki factory in Hyōgo Prefecture in August 2011. It entered service on 23 February 2012. On 30 March 2015, Toei Subway announced it had ordered a second batch of 12-600 series trains. On these trains, the magenta stripe is located at the height of the windows so it can be seen above the platform edge doors installed at every station. LCD information displays are provided above the doors. The trains entered service on 6 April 2015, with six units to be delivered by June 2016, replacing older 12-000 series trains.

11 additional 12-600 series trainsets (88 cars) were ordered from Kawasaki Heavy Industries in 2016. The first of these trains entered service in 2018, with four additional trainsets entering service per year until 2021.

References

External links

 Nippon Sharyo 12-600 series information 

Electric multiple units of Japan
12-600
Train-related introductions in 2012
Kawasaki multiple units
Nippon Sharyo multiple units
1500 V DC multiple units of Japan